King Long United Automotive Industry Co., Ltd or commonly known as King Long (literally, Golden Dragon) is a Chinese bus manufacturer headquartered in Xiamen, Fujian. Founded in December 1988, it is focused mainly on developing, manufacturing and selling large-and-medium-sized coaches and light vans.

History

Established in 1988, King Long United Automotive Industry Co., Ltd. is one of the joint ventures in China with a long history in the coach manufacturing industry. The company is now jointly owned by Xiamen Automotive Industry Corporation, Xiamen State-owned Assets Investment Co., Ltd and San Yang Industry Co., Ltd. from Taiwan, with the share proportion of each holder being 50%, 25% and 25% respectively. The King Long Group owns three subsidiaries, King Long United Automotive Industry Co., Ltd, Xiamen Golden Dragon Bus Co., Ltd., and the Higer Bus Co. Ltd.

Manufacturing facilities
The King Long facilities cover a total area of 200,000 square meters with over 1800 employees, of whom 400 are technical engineers, and 30 are postgraduates, who play a key role in different sections such as R&D, IT, production management, quality control, finance, sales and after-sales services.

Business

King Long has taken a leading position among domestic coach manufacturers in China, the largest coach market in the world. King Long has long maintained a close cooperation with parts suppliers, including German companies MAN and ZF, American companies Cummins, Dana and Neway, French company Telma, Swedish company Scania, and Japanese companies Nissan, and Hino.

King Long currently offers 5 series of products, which are subdivided into 50-plus categories, covering various buses and coaches (6-13m), for the tourism, passenger transport and city bus market. The company's products are sold in overseas markets including Australia, Costa Rica, Chile, Bulgaria, Singapore, Philippines, Saudi Arabia, Israel, Iraq, Cyprus, Lebanon, Malta, the United States, United Kingdom, Argentina, Barbados, Hong Kong, Hungary, Italy, Macau, Taiwan, Thailand, India, Malaysia, Indonesia, Mexico, Sri Lanka and Pakistan.

At the end of 2004, the relocating and technology upgrading project of King Long was formally launched as one of the key projects of Fujian Province and Xiamen City in 2005. The new plant site is located in Xiamen Automobile Industry City in Guannan Industrial Park, Jimei District, Xiamen. The project was to be constructed in two phases: Phase 1 covers an area of 25 hectares with the gross building area of 8.5 hectares, with a designed yearly production capacity for 6,000 coaches and buses. With a total investment of about RMB260,000,000 yuan, Phase 1 was expected to be completed and put into use by the end of 2005. The reserved area for Phase 2 is 15-20 hectares. Upon completion, the new plant will become one of the largest coach manufacture bases in China with an annual output of 13,000 coaches and buses of large and medium sizes.

In 2008, King Long had an 18 percent share of the export market in China. Overseas sales contributed 25 percent of King Long's sales.

Products

Vans

King Long Jinwei
King Long Kaige
King Long Kairui
King Long Jockey (King Long Saima)- A van heavily resembling the Mercedes-Benz Sprinter
King Long Longyao 6
King Long Longyao 8
King Long Ambulance
King Long Cargo Van
King Long Forest Fire Van
King Long Mini Van
King Long Police Van
King Long Postal Van

Coaches

King Long XML6118G
King Long XMQ6101Y
King Long XMQ6111Y
King Long XMQ6111CY
King Long XMQ6116Y
King Long XMQ6117Y
King Long XMQ6117Y3
King Long XMQ6118JB
King Long XMQ6118Y
King Long XMQ6119
King Long XMQ6119T
King Long XMQ6120P
King Long XMQ6122 - 12 m coach
King Long XMQ6126
King Long XMQ6126Y
King Long XMQ6127 - 12 m coach
King Long XMQ6127Y - 12 m coach
King Long XMQ6128Y
King Long XMQ6129P
King Long XMQ6129P8
King Long XMQ6129Y - 12 m coach, Edison Smart 12 in South Korea.
King Long XMQ6129Y2 - 12 m coach
King Long XMQ6129Y5 - 12 m coach
King Long XMQ6125AY - 12 m coach
King Long XMQ6130Y
King Long XMQ6133Y (King Long MAN) 
King Long XMQ6140P
King Long XMQ6140Y
King Long XMQ6140Y8
King Long XMQ6606
King Long XMQ6608
King Long XMQ6660
King Long XMQ6752
King Long XMQ6798Y
King Long XMQ6800Y
King Long XMQ6802Y
King Long XMQ6871CY
King Long XMQ6858Y
King Long XMQ6859Y
King Long XMQ6886Y
King Long XMQ6895Y
King Long XMQ6898Y
King Long XMQ6900Y
King Long XMQ6930K
King Long XMQ6960Y
King Long XMQ6996Y
King Long XMQ6996K

School bus
King Long XMQ6100ASN
King Long XMQ6660ASD
King Long XMQ6660XC
King Long XMQ6730ASD
King Long XMQ6802ASD
King Long XMQ6900BSD
King Long XMQ6998ASD

Transit bus

King Long XMQ6105G
King Long XMQ6106G
King Long XMQ6106AGHEV1
King Long XMQ6110GS
King Long XMQ6111GS
King Long XMQ6116G
King Long XMQ6119G
King Long XMQ6121G
King Long XMQ6127AGBEV3
King Long XMQ6127G
King Long XMQ6127GH1
King Long XMQ6127GH5
King Long XMQ6127GHEV4
King Long XMQ6127J
King Long XMQ6140ABD
King Long XMQ6141G
King Long XMQ6180G
King Long XMQ6180G1
King Long XMQ6180GK
King Long XMQ6181G
King Long XMQ6770AGD3
King Long XMQ6800G
King Long XMQ6801G
King Long XMQ6840G
King Long XMQ6840G2
King Long XMQ6841G
King Long XMQ6850G
King Long XMQ6891G
King Long XMQ6891G1
King Long XMQ6892G
King Long XMQ6900G
King Long XMQ6901G
King Long XMQ6925G
King Long XMQ6930G

City Bus
King Long XMQ6120 AGD5
King Long XMQ6121G

Other
King Long Airport Bus 6139B
King Long XMQ6886 - 9 m Midibus

Image gallery

References

External links

King Long official website 
King Long UK website 
 King Long Electric Buses Maintain Fast Growing Momentum.

Bus manufacturers of China
Electric bus manufacturers
Vehicle manufacturing companies established in 1988
Chinese companies established in 1988
Manufacturing companies based in Xiamen
Chinese brands
Multinational companies headquartered in China
Electric vehicle manufacturers of China